Caltoris brunnea, the dark branded swift is a butterfly in the family Hesperiidae. It was described by Samuel Constantinus Snellen van Vollenhoven in 1876. It is found in the Indomalayan realm in Burma and in Java as subspecies C. b. caere (de Nicéville, 1891).

Larvae have been recorded feeding on Bambusa species and Imperata cylindrica.

Subspecies
Caltoris brunnea brunnea (Java)
Caltoris brunnea caere (de Nicéville, 1891) (Myanmar)

References

External links
Caltoris at Markku Savela's Lepidoptera and Some Other Life Forms

Caltoris
Butterflies described in 1876
Butterflies of Asia
Taxa named by Samuel Constantinus Snellen van Vollenhoven